Korythio is a former municipality in Arcadia, Peloponnese, Greece. Since the 2011 local government reform it is part of the municipality Tripoli, of which it is a municipal unit. The municipal unit has an area of 115.182 km2. Population 2,133 (2011). The seat of the municipality was in Steno. Other villages in the municipal unit are Elaiochori and Zevgolateio.

References

External links
Official Website - Municipality of Korythio

Populated places in Arcadia, Peloponnese